BPSA may mean:

 Baden-Powell Scouts' Association
 Baden-Powell Service Association (Canada)
 Baden-Powell Service Association (United States)
 Bio Process Systems Alliance
 Bermuda Public Services Association
 Banca Popolare Sant'Angelo